Alexander Klitzpera (born 19 October 1977) is a German former professional footballer who played as a central defender.

Career
Born in Munich, Klitzpera played four years for FC Bayern Munich II, three years for Arminia Bielefeld and than six years successfully for Alemannia Aachen until 2008. With Aachen he was DFB-Pokal finalist in 2004 and playing in the 2004–05 UEFA Cup and the 2006–07 Bundesliga. In August 2008, he signed with FSV Frankfurt.

In February 2015 Klitzpera was hired by his former club Alemannia Aachen, in the position of sporting director.

References

External links
 

1977 births
Living people
German footballers
Germany under-21 international footballers
Association football defenders
FC Bayern Munich II players
Arminia Bielefeld players
Alemannia Aachen players
FSV Frankfurt players
VfL Wolfsburg II players
Bundesliga players
2. Bundesliga players
Footballers from Munich